Sandler and Young were an American musical duo from the 1960s through the 1980s, composed of Belgian singer Tony Sandler and native New Yorker Ralph Young.

First success
Sandler and Young appeared with Polly Bergen in her show at the Las Vegas Desert Inn Hotel and Casino, doing eleven minutes between her costume changes. This engagement was a smashing success and was the first of many the three would make together.  Sandler and Young's careers were further advanced by their performance at the Coconut Grove nightclub in the Ambassador Hotel in Hollywood, where a long list of celebrities and movie stars, through word of mouth, attended their show. Among the people in attendance was Alan W. Livingston, then-president of Capitol Records, who immediately signed them to a recording contract.

Fame
During the following ten years, they released several albums for Capitol, including Side by Side, Pretty Things Come in Twos, On the Move, Honey Come Back, Odds & Ends, More and More, The "In Person" Album, and The Christmas World of Tony Sandler & Ralph Young. Their producer was future Capitol president Dave Cavanaugh, and their musical directors included Billy May, Jimmy Jones, Luther Henderson, and Sid Feller.

Sandler & Young performed numerous concerts in clubs, showrooms, and concert halls throughout the US and Canada. In 1972 Sandler & Young appeared in an extended Christmas commercial from General Motors. This was part of a Canadian television special called Two Christmases, sponsored by GM.

Starting in 1968, they returned frequently, and sometimes for several weeks, to Las Vegas, as headliners at the Sahara Hotel, the Dunes Hotel, the Flamingo Hilton (1969, 1970, 1972, 1973, 1974), Caesars Palace (1969) and the Thunderbird Hotel (1976).

Guest shots followed on such national TV shows as The Ed Sullivan Show (7 episodes), The Mike Douglas Show (30 episodes), The Hollywood Palace, The Milton Berle Show, The Andy Williams Show, The Merv Griffin Show (26 episodes), The Tonight Show Starring Johnny Carson (9 episodes), The David Frost Show (3 episodes), The Red Skelton Show (03/28/67), The Joey Bishop Show (2 episodes), That Show with Joan Rivers (12/13/68), and The Today Show, and Sandler and Young became one of the most popular acts in show business.

In 1969, Sandler and Young hosted the popular Kraft Music Hall from London for NBC for 13 weeks.

In the early 1970s, Sandler and Young started their own label, RALTON Records, and released the following albums on it: Once More with Feeling, You've Got a Friend, Sandler & Young Go Country, The Many Moods of Tony Sandler & Ralph Young, Pause a While and Sandler & Young Thank Irving Berlin.

In the 1980s, the duo was parodied by Martin Short (playing Sandler) and Eugene Levy (playing Young) on the comedy TV show SCTV.

Retirement
In the mid-eighties, Young, then 65, retired from the concert stage to spend more time with his family in Palm Springs and Los Angeles. Sandler, the younger of the two by 16 years, was not ready to stop performing and toured the country with his repertoire of musical theatre and European songs as well as his one man-show Chevalier, Maurice and Me.

In 1995 Capitol Records released the CD Sandler & Young, Great Gentlemen of Song.

On special occasions, Sandler and Young re-teamed to perform to sellout crowds. Their last appearance together was at the 2003 All Stars benefit show Let Freedom Ring in Palm Springs to honor the victims of 9/11.

Ralph Young died at his Palm Springs home on August 22, 2008 at the age of 90.

Many of the Sandler and Young albums have been remastered and re-released on CD.

Accolades
In 1998, a Golden Palm Star on the Palm Springs, California, Walk of Stars was dedicated to them.

References

External links
 
 A collection of arrangements written for Sandler and Young is housed at the Great American Songbook Foundation.  See the inventory here.

American musical duos